Vlatkovići is a village in Kneževo municipality, Republika Srpska, Bosnia and Herzegovina.

Population

Ethnic composition, 1991 census

References 

 Official results from the book: Ethnic composition of Bosnia-Herzegovina population, by municipalities and settlements, 1991. census, Zavod za statistiku Bosne i Hercegovine - Bilten no.234, Sarajevo 1991.

Villages in Republika Srpska
Kneževo, Bosnia and Herzegovina